Fanny is a feminine given name. Its origins include diminutives of the French name Frances meaning "free one", and of the name "Estefanía", a Spanish version of Stephanie, meaning "crown".  The name Fanny (פאני/פני) may also derive from Yiddish, as an anglicized Feigel, Feigele, Feiga or Fejga, meaning "bird".

People

Given name
Fanny Adams (1859–1867), English murder victim
Fanny Ardant (born 1949), French actress
Fanny Blankers-Koen (1918–2004), Dutch track and field athlete, Olympic and world champion and world record holder
Fanny Brice (1891–1951), stage name for the American comedian, actress and singer Fania Borach
Fanny Brownbill (1890–1948), Australian pioneering politician
Fanny Cano (1944–1983), Mexican actress and producer
Fanny DuBois Chase (1828–1902), American social reformer and author
Fanny Chmelar (born 1985), German alpine skier
Fanny Clar (1875-1944), French journalist, writer, and socialist intellectual 
Fanny Jackson Coppin (1837–1913), African-American educator and missionary
Fanny Cory (1877–1972), American artist and illustrator best known for her comic strip Little Miss Muffet
Fanny Cottençon (born 1957), French actress
Fanny Crosby (1820–1915), American mission worker, poet, lyricist, and composer
Fanny Davenport (1850–1898), Anglo-American stage actress
Fanny Davies (1861–1934), British pianist
Fanny Murdaugh Downing (1831–1894), American author and poet
Fanny Elssler (1810–1884), Austrian ballerina
Fanny Farmer, American candy manufacturer and retailer
Fanny Fischer (born 1986), German sprint canoer
Fanny Furner (1864–1938), Australian activist for the rights of women and children
Fanny Hertz (1830–1908), British educationalist and feminist
Fanny Holland (1847–1931), English singer and comic actress
Fanny Howe (born 1940), American poet, novelist, and short story writer
Fanny Kaplan (1890–1918), Russian would-be assassin of Vladimir Lenin
Fanny Kekelaokalani (1806–1880), member of the royal family of the Kingdom of Hawaii, and mother of a Queen consort
Fanny Lam Christie (born 1952), Hong Kong sculptor
Fanny Law (born 1953), Hong Kong civil servant
Fanny Létourneau (born 1979), Canadian synchronized swimmer
Fanny Lewald (1811–1889), German author and feminist
Fanny Lu (born 1973), Colombian singer-songwriter and actress
Fanny Mendelssohn (1805–1847), German composer and pianist, sister of composer Felix Mendelssohn
Fanny E. Minot (1847–1919), American public worker
Fanny Murray (1729–1778), English courtesan
Fanny Purdy Palmer (1839–1923), American author, lecturer and activist
Fanny Huntington Runnells Poole (1863–1940), American writer, book reviewer
Fanny Ramos (born 1995), French kickboxer 
Fanny Raoul (1771-1833), French feminist writer, journalist, philosopher and essayist
Fanny Rinne (born 1980), German field hockey player
Fanny Rozet (1881–1958), French sculptor
Fanny Searls (1851–1939), American doctor and botanical collector
Fanny Smith (born 1992), Swiss freestyle skier
Fanny Stål (1821–1889), Swedish pianist
Fanny Sunesson (born 1967), Swedish golf caddie
Fanny Vágó (born 1991), Hungarian footballer
Fanny Waterman (1920–2020), English musician, founder of the Leeds International Piano Competition
Fanny Westerdahl (1817–1873), Swedish dramatic stage actress

Pet form of Frances
Fanny Allen (1784–1819), first woman from New England to become a Catholic nun
Fanny Brawne (1800–1865), engaged to poet John Keats
Fanny Brough (1852–1914), British stage actress
Frances Burney (1752–1840), English novelist, diarist and playwright
Fanny Crosby (1820–1915), American Methodist rescue mission worker, poet, lyricist and composer
Fanny Durack (1889–1956), Australian swimmer
Fanny Fitzwilliam (1801–1854), English stage actress and theatre manager
Fanny Imlay (1794–1816), illegitimate daughter of the British writer and feminist Mary Wollstonecraft
Fanny Kemble (1809–1893), English actress, writer and anti-slavery figure
Frances Nelson (1761–1831), wife of Admiral Horatio Nelson
Fanny Stevenson (1840–1914), wife of writer Robert Louis Stevenson
Frances Wimperis (1840–1925), New Zealand artist

Others
Fanny Altendorfer, Austrian luger who competed in the late 1920s
Fanny Anitùa (1887–1969), Mexican contralto opera singer
Baroness Franziska Fanny von Arnstein (1758–1818), leader of society in Vienna, born Vögele Itzig
Fanny Balbuk (1840–1906), prominent Noongar Whadjuk woman who lived in Perth, Western Australia
Fanny Amelia Bayfield (died 1891), English-born Canadian artist and educator
Fanny de Beauharnais (1737–1813), French lady of letters and salon holder, born Marie-Anne-Françoise Mouchard
Fanny Bendixen (1820–1899), hotelier and saloon keeper during the gold-rush period in British Columbia
Fanny Blood (1758–1785), English illustrator and educator and longtime friend of Mary Wollstonecraft
Fanny Bornedal (born 2000), Danish actress
Fanny Bouvet (born 1994), French diver
Fanny Brennan (1921–2001), French-American surrealist painter
Fanny Britt (born 1977), Canadian playwright and translator living in Quebec
Fanny Buitrago (born 1943), Colombian fiction writer and playwright
Fanny Cadeo (born 1970), Italian showgirl, model, television personality and singer
Fanny Cagnard (born 1981), French competitive figure skater
Fanny Calder (1838–1923), promoter of education in domestic subjects in Liverpool
Fanny Carby (1925–2002), British actress
Fanny Carlsen, German screenwriter of the silent era
Fanny Carrió (fl. 1879–1949), Uruguayan liberal feminist
Fanny Cerrito (1817–1909), Italian ballet dancer and choreographer born Francesca Cerrito
Fanny Chamberlain (1825–1905), wife of Joshua Chamberlain
Fanny Churberg (1845–1892), Finnish landscape painter
Fanny Clamagirand (born 1984), French classical violinist
Fanny Colonna (1934–2014), French-Algerian sociologist and anthropologist
Fanny Corbaux (1812–1883), British painter and biblical commentator
Fanny Cornforth (1835–1909), model and mistress of painter Dante Gabriel Rossetti, real name thought to be Sarah Cox
Fanny Corri-Paltoni, English operatic soprano active in Europe between 1818 and 1835
Fanny Cradock (1909–1994), English restaurant critic, television cook and writer
Fanny Currey (1848–1917), Irish horticulturalist and watercolour painter
Fanny Deakin (1883–1968), politician from Newcastle-under-Lyme, Staffordshire, England
Fanny Deberghes (born 1994), French swimmer
Fanny Duarte, Dominican Republic female badminton player
Fanny Duberly (1829–1903), English soldier's wife who wrote a journal of her experiences
Fanny Carter Edson (1887–1952), American petroleum geologist
Fanny Fern (1811–1872), pen name of Sara Willis, American newspaper columnist, humorist, novelist, and author of children's stories
Fanny Garrido (1846–1917), Spanish writer
Fanny Chambers Gooch (1842–1913), American author
Fanny Heldy (1888–1973), Belgian operatic soprano born Marguerite Virginie Emma Clémentine Deceuninck
Fanny Bury Palliser (1805–1878), English writer on art, and lace
Fanny Addison Pitt (1847–1937), English actress
Fanny Rubio (born 1949), Spanish academic
Fanny Cochrane Smith (1834–1905), Aboriginal Tasmanian
Princess Fanny von Starhemberg (1875–1943), Austrian politician born Franziska Gräfin von Larisch-Mönnich
Fanny Tarnow (1779–1862), German writer born Franziska Christiane Johanna Friederike Tarnow
Frederick Fanny Walden (1888–1949), English footballer and cricketer

Fictional characters
 Fanny Hill, the protagonist of Memoirs of a Woman of Pleasure, an erotic novel by John Cleland
 Fanny Price, heroine of Jane Austen's 1814 novel Mansfield Park
 Fanny (Guilty Gear), video game character
 Fanny (Sesame Street), children's television character
 Flapper Fanny, cartoon character
 Lord Fanny, from the DC Comics series The Invisibles
 Madame Fanny La Fan, in the BBC sitcom Allo 'Allo!
 Aunt Fanny, a comic character played by Fran Allison on the radio show Don McNeill's Breakfast Club
 Aunt Fanny, in Enid Blyton's The Famous Five novel series
 Fanny Ekdahl, in Ingmar Bergman's 1982 film Fanny and Alexander
 Fanny, the main character in Marcel Pagnol's 1931 play Fanny and the 1932 film adaptation Fanny
 Francine "Fanny" Fullbright from the Cartoon Network animated series Codename: Kids Next Door

Animals
Fanny (elephant) (born 1940s), female Asian elephant who spent the majority of her life in a small zoo in Pawtucket, Rhode Island